Pseudoloessa javanica is a species of beetle in the family Cerambycidae. It was described by Stephan von Breuning in 1963. It is known from Java.

References

Gyaritini
Beetles described in 1963
Taxa named by Stephan von Breuning (entomologist)